A memorial bench, memorial seat or death bench is a piece of outdoor furniture which commemorates a dead person.  Such benches are typically made of wood, but can also be made of metal, stone, or synthetic materials such as plastics. Typically memorial benches are placed in public places.

See also
Commemorative plaque

References

Types of monuments and memorials
Monuments and memorials
Benches (furniture)